Snartemo is a village in Hægebostad municipality in Agder county, Norway. Snartemo has a population of 118 in 2015. There are historic archeological sites located in Snartemo. Hægebostad Church, built in 1844, is located in Snartemo.

The village is served by Snartemo Station on the Sørlandet Line, the only railway station in the municipality. The station is located in a valley between the Hægebostad Tunnel to the east and Kvineshei Tunnel to the west.

References

Villages in Agder
Hægebostad